is a railway station on the Keio New Line in Shibuya, Tokyo, Japan, operated by the private railway operator Keio Corporation.

Station layout

History
Hatsudai Station opened on 11 June 1914.

Surrounding area
Hatsudai is the closest station to Opera City Tower and the New National Theatre, Tokyo.  The area is served by several bus lines as well, in particular along Opera Dori and Shin Kokuritsu Gekijo-mae at the Central and South Exits.

The area around Hatsudai Station is home to corporations such as Lotte, Casio and NTT East, as well as to the Kanto International Senior High School.

References

Keio New Line
Stations of Keio Corporation
Railway stations in Tokyo
Railway stations in Japan opened in 1914